Hermógenes Pérez de Arce Lopetegui (April 19, 1845 – August 26, 1902) was a Chilean politician and journalist.

1845 births
1902 deaths
People from Valdivia
Chilean people of Spanish descent
Independent politicians in Chile
Chilean Ministers of Finance
Deputies of the XXII Legislative Period of the National Congress of Chile
Deputies of the Constituent Congress of Chile (1891)
People of the Chilean Civil War of 1891